Apple Blossom may refer to:

Plants
The flower of the apple tree (see )
Apple blossom tree, a species of tree in the family Fabaceae
A shrub cultivar of the genus Escallonia

Other uses
 Apple Blossom (song), a White Stripes song from the album De Stijl
 Apple Blossom, 1919 an operetta by Fritz Kreisler 
 Apple Blossoms, a painting by John Everett Millais, on display at the Lady Lever Art Gallery
 Apple Blossom Handicap, an American horse race
 Apple Blossom Mall, Winchester, Virginia
 Apple Blossom (Fabergé egg)

See also 
 
 Apple Blossom Festival (disambiguation), several festivals with such name